Insulated shipping containers are a type of packaging used to ship temperature sensitive products such as foods, pharmaceuticals, organs, blood, biologic materials, vaccines  and chemicals.  They are used as part of a cold chain to help maintain product freshness and efficacy. The term can also refer to insulated intermodal containers or insulated swap bodies.

Construction

A variety of constructions have been developed. An insulated shipping container might be constructed of:
 a vacuum flask, similar to a "thermos" bottle
 fabricated thermal blankets or liners
 molded expanded polystyrene foam (EPS, styrofoam), similar to a cooler
 other molded foams such as polyurethane, polyethylene
 sheets of foamed plastics
 Vacuum Insulated Panels (VIPs)
 reflective materials: (metallised film)
 bubble wrap or other gas filled panels
 other packaging materials and structures

Some are designed for single use while others are returnable for reuse. Some insulated containers are decommissioned refrigeration units.  Some empty containers are sent to the shipper disassembled or “knocked down”, assembled and used, then knocked down again for easier return shipment.

Shipping containers are available for maintaining cryogenic temperatures, with the use of liquid nitrogen.  Some carriers have these as a specialized service

Use

Insulated shipping containers are part of a comprehensive cold chain which controls and documents the temperature of a product through its entire distribution cycle. The containers may be used with a refrigerant or coolant such as:
 block or cube ice, slurry ice
 dry ice
 Gel or ice packs (often formulated for specific temperature ranges)
 Phase change materials (PCMs)
 Some products (such as frozen meat) have sufficient thermal mass to contribute to the temperature control and no excess coolant is required

A digital Temperature data logger or a time temperature indicator is often enclosed to monitor the temperature inside the container for its entire shipment.

Labels and appropriate documentation (internal and external) are usually required.

Personnel throughout the cold chain need to be aware of the special handling and documentation required for some controlled shipments.  With some regulated products, complete documentation is required.

Design and evaluation
The use of  “off the shelf” insulated shipping containers does not necessarily guarantee proper performance.  Several factors need to be considered:

 the sensitivity of the product to temperatures (high and low) and to time at temperatures
 the specific distribution system being used: the expected (and worst case) time and temperatures
 regulatory requirements
 the specific combination of packaging components and materials being used

In specifying an insulated shipping container, the two primary characteristics of the material are its thermal conductivity or R-value, and its thickness. These two attributes will help determine the resistance to heat transfer from the ambient environment into the payload space. The coolant material load temperature, quantity, latent heat, and sensible heat will help determine the amount of heat the parcel can absorb while maintaining the desired control temperature. Combining the attributes from the insulator and coolant will allow analysis of expected duration of the insulated shipping container system.  Testing of multi-component systems is needed.

It is wise (and sometimes mandatory) to have formal verification of the performance of the insulated shipping container.  Laboratory package testing might include ASTM D3103-07, Standard Test Method for Thermal Insulation Performance of Packages, ISTA Guide 5B: Focused Simulation Guide for Thermal Performance Testing of Temperature Controlled Transport Packaging, and others. In addition, validation of field performance (performance qualification) is extremely useful.

Specialists in design and testing of packaging for temperature sensitive products are often needed.  These may be consultants, independent laboratories, universities, or reputable vendors.  Many laboratories have certifications and accreditations: ISO 9000s, ISO/IEC 17025, etc.

Environmental Impact 
Parcel to pallet sized insulated shipping containers have historically been single-use products due to the low-cost material composition of EPS and water-based gel packs. The insulation material typically finds its way into landfill streams as it is not readily recyclable in the United States.

The development of reusable high-performance shipping containers have been shown to reduce packing waste by 95% while also contributing significant savings to other environmental pollutants.

See also

 Cold chain
Packaging engineering
Shelf life
Slurry ice
Temperature measurement
 Thermal bag
Thermal insulation
Validation (drug manufacture)
Verification and Validation

References

External links and resources
"Cold Chain Management", 2003, 2006, 
 Brody, A. L., and Marsh, K, S., "Encyclopedia of Packaging Technology", John Wiley & Sons, 1997, 
 Lockhart, H., and Paine, F.A.,  "Packaging of Pharmaceuticals and Healthcare Products", 2006, Blackie, 

Food safety
Pharmaceutical industry
Shipping containers
Temperature control
Thermal protection
Articles containing video clips